The Deposition is a 1619 painting by the Flemish artist Anthony van Dyck. It dates to around 1619 and reworks his 1615 version of the same subject It is held in the Ashmolean Museum, in Oxford, where it was offered by Charles T. Maude in 1869.

References

Paintings in the collection of the Ashmolean Museum
1619 paintings
Religious paintings by Anthony van Dyck
Paintings of the Descent from the Cross
Paintings of the Virgin Mary
Paintings depicting Mary Magdalene